Péter Horváth (born 12 February 1992) is a Hungarian football player who plays for Siófok.

Club career
On 1 July 2017 Horvath moved from MTK Budapest FC to Soproni VSE on a free transfer.

Club statistics

Updated to games played as of 8 December 2018.

External links
 Profile at HLSZ 
 Profile at MLSZ 
 

1992 births
Living people
People from Szekszárd
Hungarian footballers
Association football forwards
Szekszárdi UFC footballers
MTK Budapest FC players
BFC Siófok players
Soproni VSE players
Szolnoki MÁV FC footballers
Paksi FC players
Nemzeti Bajnokság I players
Nemzeti Bajnokság II players
Sportspeople from Tolna County